Hajjiabad-e Mallu (also Romanized as Ḩājjīābād-e Mallū; also known as Tol-e Mallū-ye Bālā) is a village in Khuzi Rural District, Varavi District, Mohr County, Fars Province, Iran. At the 2006 census, its population was 81, in 13 families.

References 

Populated places in Mohr County